Pakistan competed at the 2022 World Games held in Birmingham, United States from 7 to 17 July 2022.

Competitors
The following is the list of number of competitors in the Games.

Cue sports

Pakistan competed in cue sports.

References

Nations at the 2022 World Games
World Games